The Guest (originally titled Phantom Planet Was Here) is the second studio album by American rock band Phantom Planet, released on February 26, 2002 by Epic Records. It was reissued in November 2003 with four additional bonus tracks, music videos, photos, and lyrics scanned from the notebook in which the album was originally written.

The album produced the band's breakthrough hit, "California", which became the theme song to the Fox TV series, The O.C., in August 2003. Its music video aired on MTV2 in mid-2002.

The track "Lonely Day" is also featured on the Smallville and Laguna Beach soundtracks.

The figure seen running across the photo on the album cover is Australian musician Ben Lee.

Track listing

Personnel

Musicians

Phantom Planet
Alex Greenwald – lead vocals, guitar, keyboards
Sam Farrar – bass, backing vocals
Jacques Brautbar – rhythm guitar, keyboards, backing vocals
Darren Robinson – lead guitar
Jason Schwartzman – drums

Additional musicians
Adam Schlesinger – lyrics on "In Our Darkest Hour"

Production

Tchad Blake – production, recording, mixing
Jacquie Blake – engineering
Bob Ludwig – mastering
Mitchell Froom – production
Detourists – programming

Charts

References

Phantom Planet albums
Power pop albums by American artists
2002 albums